The Joker is a comic book series published by DC Comics starring the supervillain the Joker. It ran for nine issues from May–June 1975 to September–October 1976, with a tenth previously unpublished issue released in October 2019.

In 2021, it was relaunched as part of DC's Infinite Frontier relaunch following Dark Nights: Death Metal conclusion.

Publication history
Dennis O'Neil, who wrote the first issue of the series, recounted that "I stopped by Julie [Schwartz, Batman editor]'s office, and he said, 'We're going to do a Joker book'. I know that alarms went off, I could sense the problems that such a thing would entail...but it was a job". The series was launched in May 1975 by O'Neil and artist Irv Novick. In order to have him work as a protagonist, writers on the series toned down the Joker's insanity and to adhere to the Comics Code Authority, each issue would end with the Joker being apprehended, only to have escaped at the beginning of the next issue (the exceptions were issue #4, where the Joker seemingly falls to his death in a whirlpool in the ocean, only to return in the next issue as if nothing had happened and with no explanation as to how he survived; issue #5, which ends with the Joker being chased by police; issue #8, where the Joker returns to Arkham Asylum voluntarily; and issue #10, which ended on a cliffhanger that was never continued). Batman did not appear in the series.

2020s 
Following The Joker War and Dark Nights: Death Metal, James Tynion IV teamed up with Gulliem March to produce a new series, also titled The Joker, that debuted on March 2, 2021.

Issues 
 No. 1 (May–June 1975) - "The Joker's Double Jeopardy!": When a villain named Senor Alvarez breaks Batman's enemy Two-Face out of Arkham Asylum and insults the Joker as being "not a superior criminal", the Joker breaks out of Arkham and decides to both get revenge and prove he is a "superior" criminal.
 No. 2 (July–August 1975) - "The Sad Saga of Willy the Weeper!": The Joker teams up with a villain called Willy the Weeper, who has a habit of crying when he tries to commit a crime and laughing when he sees others cry, to help him steal platinum after Willy the Weeper breaks him out.
 No. 3 (September–October 1975) - "The Last Ha Ha": After a battle with the Joker, the Creeper gets amnesia and is persuaded by the Joker that he is the Joker's ally.
 No. 4 (November–December 1975) - "A Gold Star for the Joker": The Joker falls in love with DC hero the Green Arrow's girlfriend Dinah Laurel Lance and gives her a choice: marry the Joker or die!
 No. 5 (January–February 1976) - "The Joker Goes 'Wilde'!": The Joker competes with Justice League foes the Royal Flush Gang for four valuable paintings done by the late artist Thaddeus Wilde.
 No. 6 (March–April 1976) - "Sherlock Stalks the Joker!": When the Joker hits Clive Sigerson, an actor playing the famous detective Sherlock Holmes, on his head with a pipe, Sigerson believes he is Holmes and that the Joker is Holmes' archenemy, Professor Moriarty. "Holmes" "stalks" the Joker with the help of a stagehand sent to follow him (who used to be a sailor who worked on the docks) named "Dock" Watson.
 No. 7 (May–June 1976) - "Luthor -- You're Driving Me Sane!": An experiment of Superman villain Lex Luthor's goes awry (thanks to the Joker's interference) and gives the Joker Luthor's genius and Luthor the Joker's insanity.
 No. 8 (July–August 1976) - "The Scarecrow's Fearsome Face-Off!": When the Joker steals some "fear-gas" from S.T.A.R. Labs, he ends up competing with fellow Batman villain the Scarecrow to see whose "fear-based" weapon is the best. The Joker wins.
 No. 9 (September–October 1976) - "The Cat and the Clown!": The Joker and Batman's "frenemy" Catwoman end up competing for a movie actor's trained feline sidekick. Catwoman's victory leads to a two-way rivalry...
 No. 10 (October–December 2019) - "99 and 99/100% Dead!": The Joker makes a deal with "Lou Cipher" to defeat the Justice League and kill a scientist developing a health serum. After defeating the Flash, the Black Canary, the Green Arrow, and Wonder Woman, the Joker discovers that, while they lack pulses, the League members continue to have brainwaves.

Unpublished issue #10
The letters page of The Joker #9 (Sept.–Oct. 1976) mentions that Martin Pasko was writing a Joker vs. the Justice League of America story titled "99 and 99/100% Dead!" to appear in The Joker #10 as the first part of a two- or three-issue story arc, which was never published despite being listed as "on sale right now" on the Daily Planet promotional page for August 16, 1976. In the end notes of The Greatest Joker Stories Ever Told (1989), it is noted that The Joker editor Julius Schwartz had no recollection of this story ever being completed; however, Pasko found xeroxed pages of the story which he sold on eBay in 2011. A cover for issue #10 was drawn by Ernie Chan, but was not finished at the time. The Joker #10 was published for the first time on August 14, 2019 in DC's The Joker: The Bronze Age Omnibus (which also contains The Joker #1-9 as well as other DC Comics Joker stories from the 1970s) and as a stand-alone issue on October 3.

Collected editions

Pre-Crisis (1975-1976 and 2019)
 The Greatest Joker Stories Ever Told, includes The Joker #3, HC: December 1988, SC: October 1997, 288 pages, 
 Stacked Deck: The Greatest Joker Stories Ever Told - Expanded Edition, includes The Joker #3, HC (leather-bound): November 1990, 352 pages,  
 The Joker: The Clown Prince of Crime, collects The Joker #1–9, SC: November 2013, 176 pages, 
 The Joker: The Bronze Age Omnibus, collects The Joker #1–10, HC: August 2019, 832 pages,

Infinite Frontier (2021-present)
 The Joker Vol. 1, collects The Joker (vol. 2) #1-5, Batman (vol. 3) #100, Batman: The Joker War Zone,

Animation 
 Willy the Weeper appeared as a one-time villain in the Batman: The Brave and the Bold TV episode "Joker: The Vile and the Villainous!", voiced by Tim Conway, in which the Joker recruits him into becoming a supervillain again after facing a humiliating defeat by Bulletman.

References

External links 
 The Joker at the DC Comics Database
 
 
 The Joker at Mike's Amazing World of Comics

Joker
Joker
Comics by Dennis O'Neil
Joker
Defunct American comics
Comic book
Unpublished comics